Cholish is an urban-type settlement in Xorazm Region, Uzbekistan. It is part of Urganch District. Its population is 6,500 (2016).

References

Populated places in Xorazm Region
Urban-type settlements in Uzbekistan